Mount Estes is a flattish mountain  south of Mount Aurora in the southern part of Black Island in the Ross Archipelago. It was named by the Advisory Committee on Antarctic Names (1999) after Steve A. Estes of the Geophysical Institute, University of Alaska, Fairbanks, who investigated the seismicity of nearby Mount Erebus, 1980–81 and 1981–82.

References 

Mountains of the Ross Dependency
Black Island (Ross Archipelago)